

This is a list of the National Register of Historic Places listings in Armstrong County, Pennsylvania.

This is intended to be a complete list of the properties and districts on the National Register of Historic Places in Armstrong County, Pennsylvania, United States.  The locations of National Register properties and districts for which the latitude and longitude coordinates are included below, may be seen in a map.

There are 14 properties and districts listed on the National Register in the county.

Current listings

|}

See also 

 List of Pennsylvania state historical markers in Armstrong County

References 

Armstrong County